2016 Citrus Bowl may refer to:

 2016 Citrus Bowl (January), an American football game between the Michigan Wolverines and the Florida Gators, played as part of the 2015 season
 2016 Citrus Bowl (December), an American football game between the LSU Tigers and the Louisville Cardinals, played as part of the 2016 season

See also
 Citrus Bowl